Tactusa bechi is a moth of the family Erebidae first described by Michael Fibiger in 2010. It is known from Assam in north-eastern India.

The wingspan is about 11 mm. The ground colour of the forewing is light yellow, with an acutely angled blackish patch in the upper medial area, a black subterminal area and three black dots on the costa between the medial patch and the apex. Only the subterminal and terminal lines are indicated, the former inwardly outlined by light yellow and the latter marked by interneural black spots. The hindwing is dark grey, with a hardly visible discal spot and the underside is unicolorous grey.

References

Micronoctuini
Taxa named by Michael Fibiger
Moths described in 2010